The 2020 Alderney general election was held on 28 November 2020 to elect 5 members of the States of Alderney who will serve until 2024.

Results

References

Elections in Alderney
Alderney
2020 in Guernsey
November 2020 events in Europe